Qamar Javed Bajwa  (born 11 November 1960) is a retired Pakistani army general who served as the tenth chief of the army staff of Pakistan from 29 November 2016 to 29 November 2022. In 2018 he was ranked 68th in the Forbes list of the World's Most Powerful People.

Originally from Gakhar Mandi, Bajwa was born into a Punjabi Jat family of Bajwa clan in Karachi. Bajwa was educated at the F. G. Sir Syed College and Gordon College in Rawalpindi before joining the Pakistan Military Academy in 1978. Bajwa was commissioned in 1980 in the 16th Battalion of the Baloch Regiment. Prior to his appointment as the chief of army staff, he served at the General Headquarters as the inspector general of the training and evaluation from September 2015 to November 2016 and as field commander of the X Corps from August 2013 to September 2015 which is responsible for the area along the Line of Control in Kashmir. In addition, he served as a brigadier in the UN mission in Congo and as a brigade commander in 2007. Towards the end of his career as army chief, tax details of Bajwa's family members, acknowledged as a "leak" by the Pakistani government, were leaked to the press, alleging increases in the billions throughout his tenure.

Early life and education
Born in Karachi, Sindh, on 11 November 1960, Bajwa was educated at the F. G. Sir Syed College and Gordon College in Rawalpindi before joining the Pakistan Military Academy in 1978. His family hails from Ghakhar Mandi, Punjab. His father Muhammad Iqbal Bajwa was an officer of Pakistan Army who died while in service in 1967 in Quetta, Balochistan, Pakistan. Bajwa was seven years old when his father died and he was the youngest of five siblings. He and his siblings were raised by their mother, who died in September 2013. Bajwa's father-in-law is retired major general Ijaz Amjad (brother of Iftikhar Khan Janjua).

Bajwa completed his secondary and intermediate education at F. G. Sir Syed College and Gordon College in Rawalpindi before joining the Pakistan Army in 1978, which directed him to attend the military academy. He was sent to attend the Pakistan Military Academy in Kakul and passing out in 1980.

Bajwa is a graduate of the Canadian Army Command and Staff College and the Naval Postgraduate School in Monterey, California, United States. He also attended the National Defence University, Islamabad.

Military career
After joining the Pakistan Army in 1978, Bajwa who was enrolled at the Pakistan Military Academy (PMA) in Kakul, passed out with the class of 62nd PMA Long Course and gained commission as second lieutenant, on 24 October 1980 in the 16th Baloch Regiment at the Sialkot Cantonment – the same unit that his father commanded.

In 1988, Bajwa briefly served in the 5th Northern Light Infantry in Azad Kashmir. In addition, he served in the X Corps, stationed in Rawalpindi, as a staff officer. Upon promotion as one-star rank army general, Bajwa served as the chief of staff (COS) at the X Corps.

In 2003, Bajwa commanded the Pakistan Armed Forces-Africa Command, attached to the UN peacekeeping mission MONUSCO, in D. R. Congo. Bajwa served in the D. R. Congo as a brigade commander under the then-major general Bikram Singh, the former chief of the army staff of the Indian Army from 2012 to 2014. Singh later termed Bajwa's performance there as "professional and outstanding."

After being promoted to the two-star rank in May 2009, Bajwa took over the command of the Force Command Northern Areas division as its GOC, stationed in Gilgit-Baltistan, Pakistan.

In August 2011, he was honored with the Hilal-i-Imtiaz (Military), and posted as an instructor at the School of Infantry and Tactics, Quetta, and later taught staff course at Command and Staff College in Quetta, and course on national security at the National Defence University, Islamabad.

On 14 August 2013, Bajwa was promoted to three-star rank and posted as field commander of the X Corps, stationed in Rawalpindi. He was appointed as Grade-I officer during his tenure as field commander of the X Corps. The appointment was commented in the news media that noted that Bajwa had been posted in X Corps thrice, which is the army's most important and largest corps, which has experience of keeping control over the situation in Kashmir.

In 2014, Bajwa was appointed as colonel commandant of the Baloch Regiment.

On 22 September 2015, Bajwa was posted in the General Headquarters when he was appointed as the inspector-general of the training and evaluation (IGT&E). There he was a principal staff officer to the then-chief of army staff Raheel Sharif.

Chief of army staff 
In 2016, Raheel Sharif dismissed rumours of seeking the extension for his term. Initially, the race for the appointment for the army chief was rumored between Zubair Hayat and Javed Ramday who was close to the first family. However, prime minister Nawaz Sharif announced to appoint the-then senior most army general, Zubair Hayat as the Chairman Joint Chiefs of Staff Committee.

On 29 November 2016, Sharif eventually announced to appoint Bajwa - the fourth by seniority, as the chief of army staff, superseding two generals who were senior than him. His strong pro-democracy stance and views may have influenced his appointment as the army chief as noted by the media pundits. Reuters reported that Sharif picked Bajwa because of his low-key style. He was also noted as the fourth oldest chief of army staff.

In December 2016, he was awarded the Nishan-e-Imtiaz.

Under the command of Bajwa, the nationwide counter-terrorism Operation Radd-ul-Fasaad and Khyber-4 were launched in February 2017 and July 2017, respectively.

In 2018 he was ranked 68th in the Forbes list of the World's Most Powerful People, compiled by Forbes magazine, which called him de facto the most powerful person in Pakistan who "established himself as a mediator and proponent of democracy".

On July 25, 2018, general elections were held in Pakistan. They have been alleged by some as the ‘dirtiest’ elections in Pakistan history  with army under Bajwa being accused of manipulating the elections and engineering a victory for Pakistan Tehreek-e-Insaaf over army's challenger Pakistan Muslim League (N). However, the Election Commission of Pakistan rejected the claim; the Free and Fair Election Network (FAFEN), a top electoral watchdog, acknowledged that there had been significant improvements in the election process, and the European Union Election Observation Mission acknowledged that that no election rigging had been observed during the election day in general, although the latter did find a "lack of equality" in the elections. Despite the opposition's allegations, it voluntarily decided not to boycott parliament, lending legitimacy to the electoral process via parliamentary participation. Recounts were conducted in a total of 94 constituencies by the Election Commission, after which Khan's PTI emerged as the largest party in the National Assembly, winning 115 seats.

The former prime minister of Pakistan, Nawaz Sharif alleged that Bajwa was behind his disqualification from the prime minister' office by putting pressure on judiciary and on the Supreme Court. He also alleged that Bajwa was also involved in rigging the general election. Subsequently, Muhammad Safdar Awan, son-in-law of Nawaz Sharif was arrested allegedly through pressure in the  aftermath of enforced disappearance of Sindh Police's provincial senior police officer Mushtaq Mahar.

In October 2018, Bajwa was awarded the Order of the Military Merit by Jordan's King Abdullah II.

On 19 August 2019, his tenure as army chief was extended for another three years, starting from November 2019 until November 2022, by the prime minister of Pakistan Imran Khan. However, on 26 November 2019, the Supreme Court of Pakistan suspended the three-year extension. On 28 November 2019, the Supreme Court of Pakistan announced a short order allowing a 6-month extension in Bajwa's term as the COAS, during which the parliament was to legislate on the extension/reappointment of an army chief. On 8 January 2020, the Senate of Pakistan passed the Pakistan Army (Amendment) Bill 2020, allowing for Bajwa's tenure extension up to three years until 29 November 2022.

In April 2022, Bajwa publicly suggested at a security forum in Islamabad that Pakistan had been pushed into dependence on China. Nevertheless, highlighting the attacks on Chinese nationals in Karachi, Chinese general Zhang Youxia asked Bajwa to stop what it called attacks on its nationals. Bajwa vowed to enhance counter-terror cooperation.

Controversy
Following Imran Khan's ouster as Prime Minister, supporters of Khan's party Pakistan Tehreek-e-Insaf called for Bajwa's resignation as army chief on Twitter, and Twitter trends denouncing the general as a "traitor" reached over a million tweets.

In the waning days of his tenure, details of Bajwa and his family's tax and assets documents were leaked to the press by journalist Ahmad Noorani on his blog Fact Focus, alleging an increase of nearly Rs. 13 billion in the general's family's assets throughout his tenure as army chief, including an international business, multiple foreign properties and capital, as well as commercial plazas and properties, farmhouses, and residential real estate throughout the major cities of Pakistan. Bajwa's daughter-in-law became a Pakistani billionaire a few days before being wed to Bajwa's son, largely through receiving property in the army-run Defense Housing Authority (DHA), while Bajwa's wife became a multi-billionaire through his tenure as army chief, and she was repeatedly warned by Pakistan's tax bureau the Federal Board of Revenue (FBR) for concealing assets. The report has also alleged that the father-in-law of Bajwa's son has similarly amassed wealth, both in Pakistan and abroad, throughout his tenure as army chief.

Bajwa reacted to the report by denying involvement in the affairs of his family members, and by inviting the National Accountability Bureau (NAB) to interrogate them if any discrepancies are found in their asset documents. Following the publication of the article, the media platform FactFocus faced government blackouts in Pakistan. Reporters Without Borders condemned the move, calling it "unacceptable in a mature democracy that a perfectly sourced and careful investigative report about an issue of considerable public interest for Pakistanis should be brutally censored in this way".

Although army spokesmen rejected the claims as "baseless" "propaganda", the country's tax bureau began probing over a dozen government officers, and suspended two high-ranking officers, both in connection to the tax claims, while the Pakistani government declared the tax leak by Noorani as illegal, and announced that they had tracked down the persons responsible for what they termed as a leak- contrary to the claims of army spokesmen. In December 2022, the federal tax bureau formally charged three government officers for unauthorized access into the tax records of Mahnoor Sabir, daughter-in-law of Bajwa, and illegally shared that information. Following the announcement of the government's investigations, Ahmed Noorani claimed that the government of Pakistan, in particular the finance minister Ishaq Dar (who had labeled the data mentioned in the article as an "illegal and unwarranted leakage") had essentially authenticated Noorani's tax leaks by acknowledging the data as a "leak".

Following General Bajwa's retirement, the mother of slain journalist Arshad Sharif requested the Chief Justice of Pakistan to formally charge General Bajwa, among other military officers, for the "targeted, premeditated, planned and calculated murder" of her son, claiming members of the military's Public Relations division began threatening Sharif after he emerged as a critic of General Bajwa following the success of the vote-of-no-confidence against Imran Khan, particularly in a program called “Woh Kon Tha”, aired on ARY News, in which Sharif insinuated General Bajwa had a hand in overthrowing his democratically elected Prime Minister.

Bajwa doctrine

The term "Bajwa Doctrine" was coined by the Royal United Services Institute after Bajwa's address to the 54th Munich Security Conference in 2018. This emphasised what he called "biting back hard" against threats from the Trump administration. A second version of the doctrine was discussed with journalists in March 2018, stressing democracy, ensuring proper respect of the institutions of the state, eliminating terrorism, bringing terrorists into the mainstream, and viewing the devolution provisions of the eighteenth amendment with skepticism. He has urged his fellow citizens, especially the youth, to fight extremism, saying it is a key driving force for terrorism.

Journalist Suhail Warraich commented on the doctrine in detail writing for The News International.

A "Bajwa Doctrine 2.0" was outlined in March 2021 during the Islamabad Security Dialogue. This centred on four themes: an enduring peace internal and external to Pakistan, non-interference in the internal affairs of neighbouring and regional countries, building intra-regional trade and connectivity, and bringing sustainable development via investment and economic hubs within the region. He also said that national security was not the preserve of the armed forces and that "unless our own house is in order, nothing good could be expected from outside," and that "It is time to bury the past and move forward. But for the resumption of the peace process or meaningful dialogue, our neighbour will have to create a conducive environment, particularly in Indian-Occupied Kashmir."

Personal life
Bajwa is married to Ayesha Amjad. The couple have two sons, Saad and Ali.

He is an avid reader and is interested in the history of Europe. He enjoys cricket and used to play cricket as a wicket-keeper.

Awards and decorations

Foreign decorations

Effective dates of promotion

See also
Pakistan Army
Inter-Services Public Relations
Chairman Joint Chiefs of Staff Committee

References

External links

Pakistan Army official website

1960 births
Punjabi people
People from Gujranwala
Government Gordon College alumni
Pakistan Military Academy alumni
Naval Postgraduate School alumni
Pakistani generals
Academic staff of the National Defence University, Pakistan
Pakistani expatriates in the Democratic Republic of the Congo
People of the Congo Crisis
Chiefs of Army Staff, Pakistan
Recipients of Hilal-i-Imtiaz
Recipients of Nishan-e-Imtiaz
Living people